SimCity: BuildIt is a city-building mobile game. Developed by TrackTwenty and published by Electronic Arts, it was launched in late 2014. The game is part of the SimCity franchise, and is available to download from the Google Play Store, Amazon Appstore and the Apple App Store. 

This game allows users to solve real-life situations like fire, sewage, pollution and traffic, and helps in dealing with problems that the public faces. Players can connect and compete with other users for more connected gameplay.

Gameplay 
The game is freemium (free-to-play with pop-up advertisements and in-app purchases). It utilizes music and graphics similar to the 2013 SimCity game, although it is slightly downscaled in order to fit in with iOS and Android devices' graphic capabilities. The game starts with 25,000 simoleons (standard in-game currency) and 50 SimCash (premium currency) on hand.

Users play as the mayor of their city and make choices in order to keep their townspeople happy. When they do this, players can earn taxes from the City Hall. The more people in the city, the more taxes are earned.

Users can trade, chat, and join clubs with others players for connected online gameplay.

Contest HQ unlocks at level 11. Club Wars, a competitive player-versus-player mode, unlocks at level 18.

There is no zoning feature in SimCity: BuildIt. Instead, buildings are moved manually. Commercial and industrial buildings produce items, and residential zones require them in order to upgrade to a higher density. Factories can also be upgraded, although this requires demolishing the original building when it is not producing anything, then replacing it with a new one.

Special buildings can be placed in the city during season tournaments and holidays such as Christmas, New Year's Day, Valentine's Day, Easter, Halloween, and Thanksgiving. Each season plays every three months, with buildings available for a limited time in categories such as movie studios, amusement parks, wild west, special landmarks, universities and parades. There are also buildings based on real-world promotional events, such as promotion of Lay's Max potato chips. Once players have used all the city space available, they can only store or swap these buildings. The game has five additional regions that players can switch to and develop. This extends the gameplay to provide varied new land, buildings, and materials, and lets players also use the season buildings.

Players can only build two-lane roads using the build tool. Players cannot manually build higher-capacity roads; they must upgrade them instead. At launch, only two, four, and six-lane roads were available; three more road types (avenues, boulevards, and streetcar avenues) were introduced in the Disasters update.

The Disasters update allows players to launch meteor collisions, earthquakes and other disasters in their own city. Each disaster has three levels to unlock.

Production and commerce 

 Factories in the game produce metal (every 1 minute), wood (3 minutes), plastic (9 minutes), seeds (20 minutes), minerals (30 minutes), chemicals (2 hours), textiles (3 hours), sugar and spices (4 hours), glass (5 hours), animal feed (6 hours), and electrical components (7 hours)
 Building Supplies Store produces nails, planks, bricks, cement, glue, and paint
 Hardware Store produces hammers, measuring tapes, shovels, cooking utensils, ladders, and drills
 Farmers Market produces vegetables, flour bags, fruit and berries, cream, corn, cheese, and beef
 Furniture Store produces chairs, tables, home textiles, cupboards, and couches
 Gardening Supplies produces grass, tree saplings, garden furniture, fire pit, lawn mower, and garden gnomes
 Donut Shop produces donuts, green smoothies, bread rolls, cherry cheesecake, frozen yogurt, and coffee
 Fashion Store produces caps, shoes, watches, business suits, and backpacks
 Fast Food Restaurant produces ice cream sandwiches, pizza, burgers, cheese fries, lemonade bottles, and popcorn
 Home Appliances produces BBQ grill, refrigerator, lighting system, TV, and microwave oven

Regions 
An update to the game added Regions, and different types of terrain to build cities on, with each having its local factories and commercial supplies. At first, the player can only pick one out of the 5 available, but if they reach a certain number of inhabitants, the player can choose another region to build on, and so forth. The 5 regions available are the following:

 Cactus Canyon, with supplies such as oil and tires
 Green Valley, with recycled fabric and cotton bags, for example
 Limestone Cliffs, with products related to string and/or silk
 Frosty Fjords, with products related to fish
 Sunny Isles, with coconuts, coconut oil, face cream, and tropical drinks

Development 
The game started development after the release of SimCity (2013) in an effort to develop a game more quickly and at a much higher profit margin. BuildIt uses many assets from SimCity (2013).

Reception 

, the application has been downloaded over 100 million times on the Google Play Store. It ranks number four all-time in simulation games downloads operating on Android.

In 2018, according to EA Mobile, SimCity: BuildIt became the most-played SimCity game ever. It stayed in the top 10 in U.S. sim and strategy games on iOS platforms, in the top 100 for U.S. games overall and in the top 150 games globally.

References 

2014 video games
Android (operating system) games
Electronic Arts games
IOS games
SimCity
Video games developed in the United States